Eilema brevivalva is a moth of the subfamily Arctiinae. It is found on Borneo. The habitat consists of lower montane forests.

The length of the forewings is 11–13 mm for males and 12–13 mm for females.

References

Moths described in 2001
brevivalva